Marosi or Maroši is a surname. Notable people with the surname include:

Ádám Marosi (born 1984), Hungarian modern pentathlete
Ildikó Marosi (1932–2020), Romanian journalist
István Marosi (born 1944), Hungarian handball player
Jan Maroši (born 1965), Czech footballer
József Marosi (born 1934), Hungarian fencer
Katalin Marosi (born 1979), Hungarian tennis player
László Marosi (born 1962), Hungarian handball player
Martin Maroši (born 1988), Slovak footballer
Marko Maroši (born 1993), Slovak footballer
Paula Marosi (born 1936), Hungarian fencer